New Edinburgh may refer to:

Places 
Canada
 New Edinburgh, Ontario
 New Edinburgh, Nova Scotia

New Zealand
 Dunedin, formerly known as New Edinburgh

Panama
 New Edinburgh, capital of Darien scheme, a former Scottish colony in modern-day Panama

United States
 New Edinburg, Arkansas, also spelled New Edinburgh

Media 
 New Edinburgh News, local newspaper of New Edinburgh, Ontario
 New Edinburgh Review, Scottish cultural magazine, founded in 1969 and retitled Edinburgh Review in 1984

See also
 Dunedin (disambiguation)
 Edinburgh (disambiguation)
 New Town, Edinburgh, Scotland.
 Edinburgh Place, Hong Kong
 Edinburgh Square, Caledonia, Ontario, Canada
 Edinburg (disambiguation)
 Edinboro (disambiguation)